Christopher M. Klein is an American judge.

Chris Klein earned bachelor's and master's degrees from Brown University and obtained his J.D. degree from the University of Chicago Law School, where he became an executive editor of the University of Chicago Law Review. Later he was admitted to various bars in the United States. He served in the Marine Corps of the United States Army as an artillery officer during the Vietnam War, following which he was a trial attorney at the United States Department of Justice for such companies as National Railroad Passenger Corporation and Steen & Hamilton. In 1988, the Eastern District of California hired him as a bankruptcy judge and ten years later promoted him to Bankruptcy Appellate Panel, where he served another ten years. From 2000 to 2007, he was a member of the American Judicial Conference's Committee on Bankruptcy Rules and advisory committee on the Federal Rules of Evidence. In 2001 he co-authored Bankruptcy Rules Made Easy and the same year published his A Guide to the Federal Rules of Civil Procedure that Apply in Bankruptcy.

References

20th-century births
Brown University alumni
University of Chicago alumni
Living people
Year of birth missing (living people)
Judges of the United States bankruptcy courts